The following highways are numbered 648:

United States